Scholte is a surname of Dutch origin. It generally has an occupational root, where the forebear was a '"scholte" = schout, but can also be patronymic, as Scholte once was used as a given name. People with this surname include:

Ben Scholte (born 2001), Dutch football player
Frederick Scholte (died 1959), Dutch-born principal tailor to the Duke of Windsor from 1919 to 1959
Jan Scholte (1910–1976), Dutch water polo player 
Owen Scholte (1896–1918), English World War I flying ace
Reinout Scholte (born 1967), Dutch cricket player 
Rob Scholte (born 1958), Dutch artist 
Suzanne Scholte (born 1959), American Human rights activist
Tom Scholte, Canadian actor

See also
 Scholte railway stop
 Scholten (disambiguation)

References

Dutch-language surnames
Occupational surnames
Patronymic surnames